Pleasure of Love may refer to:

 Pleasure of Love (Tom Tom Club song), 1983
 "The Pleasure of Love", a 2005 song by Kimeru
 "The Pleasure of Love", a literally translated title of the 1784 poem, "Plaisir d'amour"